This is a List of Australia women Test cricketers who have played Test cricket for the Australia national women's cricket team. The list is arranged in the order in which each player won her Test cap. Until 2001, players making their debut in the same Test would have their cap number determined by appearance in the batting order, except for Margaret Peden who was allocated cap number one due to being Australia's captain in the first-ever Test. Since 2001, players debuting in the same Test have had their cap number determined by alphabetical order.

Key

Players

Statistics are correct as of 30 January 2022.

See also
 List of Australia women ODI cricketers
 List of Australia women Twenty20 International cricketers
 List of Australia national cricket captains

References

 
Cricket
Test
Australian